The Source of Sviyaga River is a complex hydrological natural feature listed in the inventory of a protected area of the Ulyanovsk region, Russia.

Description

The source of Sviyaga River is the most important feature of the Protected Area, with significant conservation and environmental value.  It lies about 5 km to the southwest of Kuzovatovo, where the land rises to a height of 332 m above sea level. At this height the vegetation consists of tall-trunked pine wood, cowberry shrubs, and bilberry. Here various representatives of the pear family are found: one-sided pear, rotundifolious pear, verdant and small, pipsissewa umbellate, and sometimes a rare orchid plant can be found, neottianta cucullata. The total area is 8 hectares.

The main source of the Sviyaga River originates from a wood-bog, and is a small pure streamlet which flows into a deep broad gully with hygrophyte vegetation.

The second source is located near the village of Krasnaya Polyana. It is in poor condition due to the conduct of business such as livestock which trample the area.

The third source of Sviyaga is in a rather better position and is located to the west from the village of Baevka. It originates from a spring on the edge of a pine wood. The springs are powerful, and the water is clean.

Lower down three dams intercept the greatest part of water, creating businesses which pollute it. The first dam is where woodworking enterprise pollute the water. The second dam is cleaner, but on its banks there are various industrial buildings. Behind the second dam Sviyaga becomes a small streamlet and then in Kuzovatovo becomes a small river proceeding for some kilometers on wide floodplains. Here the upper part of Sviyaga is deeper because of an abundance of springs from underground aquifers.

See also
Protected areas of Ulyanovsk Oblast

References

 https://web.archive.org/web/20071231205649/http://eco.ulstu.ru/
 

1989 establishments in Russia
Protected areas of Russia
Geography of Ulyanovsk Oblast